Harriet Isabel Adams was an artist, scientific illustrator, and author based in Britain. She is most known for her botanical drawings, bookplates, and published volume of books, Wild Flower of the British Isles.

Life and career 
Adams may have attended the Birmingham School of Art in England, and trained as an artist before later moving to illustration and specializing in the Arts and Crafts style.

Beginning in 1906, Adams became a Fellow of the Linnean Society of London, accredited with being the oldest biological society in the world, and later a member of the Botanical Society and Exchange Club of the British Isles.

Shortly after, the first volume of her book, Wild Flowers of the British Isles, was published in 1907, followed with the second volume in 1910. Accompanied by her botanical illustrations was an in-depth guide to every wildflower found in the British Isles. This volume of books became the highlight of her career and remains one of Adams' best known works.

Reviews and honorary mentions 
Listed below are notable reviews and honorable mentions of Adams' work:

Wild Flowers of the British Isles

Volume I 
 Review written in The Spectator, under section labeled Botany, Birds, and Angling, published on September 7, 1907:
"Her book does not compete, of course, with Bentham or Hooker's hand- books; but it is sufficiently scientific to enable serious botanists to recommend it to beginners. There are some eighty full-page plates in this quarto volume. We have seen few flower drawings (always excepting Curtis's Flora Londinensis) that have given us so much pleasure to look at. From one to half-a-dozen plants are figured on a page ; but Miss Adams manages to keep the character of each species distinct, and the grouping is often full of skill and grace. We have nothing but praise for the colouring, especially the various greens. The yellow of the rock-rose is beautiful, and the more subdued mauves and pinks are excellent. It is all slightly conventional, but gives a truer effect than many an attempt at realism. The stalks are sometimes drawn too thick. For instance, in Limon eathartiewm the pedicels should be the merest threads. We regret that, though there is a description of every species in all the orders that are dealt with, only about a third are represented in the plates."

Volume II 
 Review written in an article by Nature, on December 1, 1910:
"Enough has been said to show that this book cannot rank as a valuable contribution to the science of botany, and it is all the more to be regretted when the excellence of the drawings is considered. Although in some of the plates there is unnecessary crowding, yet the draughtsmanship throughout is of a high order, and the plates of Convolvulus and Tamus communis, to mention two only, are beautiful works of art. A complete series of plant pictures of our British flora by Mrs. Adams would be of considerable value, and it is a matter for regret that so much skill and labour should have been expended on a book so pretentious and incomplete, which, with all its accuracy of drawing, unfortunately can only be regarded as a work for the drawing-room table."

References 

1863 births
1952 deaths
19th-century British women artists
20th-century British women artists
Alumni of the Birmingham School of Art
British illustrators
Botanical illustrators
Children's book illustrators